George Paul McNichol  (24 September 1929 – 28 July 2014) was a Scottish physician and university academic. He was the Principal and Vice-Chancellor of the University of Aberdeen from 1981 to 1991.

Early life
McNicol was born in Glasgow, Scotland and studied at the local Hillhead High School and medicine at the University of Glasgow.

Career
McNicol worked as a surgeon and physician before returning to academia via a Harkness Fellowship at the Washington University, St Louis in America. He then gained a PhD from the University of Glasgow in 1965. His early academic career was at the University of Glasgow and he spent a secondment at Mekerere University College Medical School, Kenyatta National Hospital, Nairobi. He returned to the UK and was appointed Professor and Head of the Department of Medicine at the University of Leeds. He left Leeds to take up his next appointment as the Principal of the University of Aberdeen in 1981. He was awarded a CBE in the 1992 New Year Honours.

Personal life
In 1959, he married Susan Moira Ritchie. They had three children and four grandchildren.

References

External links
Royal College of Physicians Obituary 2014

 

1929 births
2014 deaths
Alumni of the University of Glasgow
People educated at Hillhead High School
Principals of the University of Aberdeen
Harkness Fellows